Established in 1971, Sino Group comprises three listed companies – Sino Land Company Limited (HKSE: 083), Tsim Sha Tsui Properties Limited (HKSE: 0247), Sino Hotels (Holdings) Limited (HKSE: 1221) – and private companies held by the Ng Family.

As one of Hong Kong’s leading property developers with core businesses in property development and investment, Sino Group has grown with the communities it serves. The Group’s business interests comprise a diversified portfolio of residential, office, industrial, retail and hospitality properties across Hong Kong, mainland China, Singapore and Australia, and has developed over 250 projects, spanning more than 130 million square feet. Core business assets are further complemented by property management services, hotel investment and management, including The Fullerton Hotels & Resorts and other affiliate brands.

History
On 5 January 1971, Sino Land Company Limited was incorporated in Hong Kong. Tsim Sha Tsui Properties Limited, a holding company of Sino Land Company Limited, was publicly listed in the Hong Kong Stock Exchange in 1972. Sino Land Company Limited was publicly listed in the Hong Kong Stock Exchange in 1981. In 1995, Sino Land Company Limited spun off its hospitality business interests to create the publicly listed Sino Hotels (Holdings) Limited in the Hong Kong Stock Exchange.

Governance

Chairmen 
 Ng Teng Fong (1970–1991); founder
 Robert Ng Chee Siong (1991– ); son of Ng Teng Fong

Deputy Chairman 
 Daryl Ng Win Kong (2017– ); son of Robert Ng

Listed companies

Sino Land Company Limited 
Sino Land’s core business comprises the development of and investment in residential, office, industrial and retail properties and hotels in Mainland China, Hong Kong, Singapore and Australia. Its business is complemented by property management, security, car park operations and environmental services.

Tsim Sha Tsui Properties Limited 

Tsim Sha Tsui Properties is the holding company of Sino Land. The operations under Sino Land represent a substantial portion of the operations of TST Properties as a whole.

Sino Hotels (Holdings) Limited 

As at 31st December, 2021, Sino Hotels' portfolio comprises City Garden Hotel, Conrad Hong Kong and The Royal Pacific Hotel & Towers.

In March 2008, the Ng Teng Fong Family, the major shareholder of Sino Hotels, set up the nonprofit-making organisation named Hong Kong Heritage Conservation Foundation Limited (‘HCF’). HCF revitalised and converted the Old Tai O Police Station, a Grade II historic building, into a boutique hotel. Named Tai O Heritage Hotel, the Hotel operated by HCF as a nonprofit-making social enterprise, is part of the HKSAR Government’s ‘Revitalising Historic Buildings Through Partnership Scheme’.

See also
 Far East Organization, Singapore-based real estate developer also owned by Ng family
 Tsim Sha Tsui Centre and Empire Centre

References

External links
 

Web site of Sino Group

 
Companies listed on the Hong Kong Stock Exchange
Family-owned companies of Hong Kong
1970 establishments in Hong Kong
Holding companies established in 1970

de:Sino Land